Kalleh Gah (also known as Kallehgeh-ye Sādāt-e Maḩmūdī) is a village in Sadat Mahmudi Rural District, Pataveh District, Dana County, Kohgiluyeh and Boyer-Ahmad Province, Iran. At the 2006 census, its population was 90, in 20 families.

References 

Populated places in Dana County